Oumou Tangara (born 27 July 1994) is a Malian footballer who plays as a defender. She has been a member of the Mali women's national team.

International career
Tangara capped for Mali at senior level during the 2016 Africa Women Cup of Nations.

References

1994 births
Living people
Malian women's footballers
Mali women's international footballers
Women's association football defenders
21st-century Malian people